FITA round opens are defunct Paralympic archery events that were featured between 1960 to 1988. The classes changed between 1976 and 1980 as the number of countries competing increased, the FITA rounds were abolished in 1992 as the classes changed again.

Medalists

Men's events

Men's FITA round open

Men's FITA round team open

Men's FITA round tetraplegic A-C

Men's double FITA round amputee

Men's double FITA round integrated

Men's double FITA round novice (paraplegic)

Men's double FITA round novice tetraplegic

Men's double FITA round paraplegic

Men's double FITA round team amputee

Men's double FITA round team paraplegic

Men's double FITA round team integrated

Men's double FITA round Class 1-2

Men's double FITA round Class 3-6

Men's double FITA round division 3

Women's events

Women's FITA round open

Women's double FITA round amputee

Women's double FITA round paraplegic

Women's double FITA round novice paraplegic

Women's double FITA round division 3

Women's FITA round integrated

Women's FITA round team open 

Archery at the Summer Paralympics
Defunct events at the Summer Paralympics